Edward John Heinz (born August 30, 1932) is a retired lieutenant general in the United States Air Force who served as  director of the intelligence community staff from 1986 to 1990. He was commissioned through ROTC at the University of Minnesota in 1954.

References

1932 births
Living people
People from Hastings, Minnesota
University of Minnesota alumni
Military personnel from Minnesota
United States Air Force generals